Triple Tap is a 2010 Hong Kong action film directed by Derek Yee and starring Louis Koo and Daniel Wu. This film is a sequel to Yee's 2004 film One Nite in Mongkok, which starred Wu in a different role, and the Yee-produced 2000 film Double Tap, which starred Leslie Cheung and Alex Fong, the latter being only actor to reprise his role from both previous installments.

Plot
Champion competitive marksman Ken (Louis Koo) finishes an IPSC competition in the beginning, while suddenly comes across an armored van robbery. He sees a policeman held hostage and uses his race gun to shoot and kill four of the robbers. One of the robbers escapes and the policeman survives. The case is handled by Jerry Chong (Daniel Wu), whom Ken knows from having recently beaten him in a shooting match. Ken is found not guilty in court. Soon after, Ken is attacked by the escaped robber Pang To (Chapman To). Their confrontation reveals a very different background story and brings about a myriad of lies and traps and changes in relationships as Jerry and Ken try to outsmart each other.

Cast
 Louis Koo as Ken Kwan Yau-bok
 Daniel Wu as Jerry Chong Tze-wai
 Charlene Choi as Ting
 Li Bingbing as Anna
 Chapman To as Pang To
 Alex Fong as Miu Chi-shun
 Lam Suet as Fong Chi-wo

Release
The film was released in Hong Kong on 1 July 2010.

Accolades

References

External links

Triple Tap at the Hong Kong Cinemagic

2010 films
2010 action thriller films
2010 psychological thriller films
Hong Kong action thriller films
Hong Kong sequel films
Police detective films
2010s Cantonese-language films
Emperor Motion Pictures films
Films directed by Derek Yee
Films set in Hong Kong
Films shot in Hong Kong
2010s Hong Kong films